Gérard Chapdelaine (31 July 1935  7 August 1994) was a Social Credit party member of the House of Commons of Canada. He was a lawyer by career.

He was first elected at the Sherbrooke riding in the 1962 general election and re-elected in 1963. In the 1965 election, after being embroiled in the 1963 Social Credit party split, Chapdelaine campaigned as an independent candidate at Sherbrooke, but was defeated by independent Progressive Conservative candidate Maurice Allard.

External links
 

1935 births
Members of the House of Commons of Canada from Quebec
Independent MPs in the Canadian House of Commons
Social Credit Party of Canada MPs
20th-century Canadian lawyers
1994 deaths